Conrad is a city in and the county seat of Pondera County, Montana, United States. The population was 2,318 at the 2020 census. Each June, the Whoop Up Days, a town wide celebration that includes a parade and rodeo, takes place in Conrad.

The town incorporated in 1908.

Geography
Conrad is located at  (48.172807, -111.947131). Interstate 15 passes through the community, with access from Exits 335 and 339.

Conrad is located one hour from the Rocky Mountain front and within two hours of Glacier National Park.

Demographics

2010 census
As of the census of 2010, there were 2,570 people, 1,113 households, and 676 families residing in the city. The racial makeup of the city was 95.1% White, 0.2% African American, 1.8% Native American, 0.3% Asian, 0.2% from other races, and 2.4% from two or more races. Hispanic or Latino of any race were 1.5% of the population.

There were 1,113 households, of which 28.6% had children under the age of 18 living with them, 45.9% were married couples living together, 10.7% had a female householder with no husband present, 4.1% had a male householder with no wife present, and 39.3% were non-families. 35.1% of all households were made up of individuals, and 17.3% had someone living alone who was 65 years of age or older. The average household size was 2.19 and the average family size was 2.82.

The median age in the city was 45.7 years. 22.7% of residents were under the age of 18; 6.4% were between the ages of 18 and 24; 19.9% were from 25 to 44; 26.9% were from 45 to 64; and 24.2% were 65 years of age or older. The gender makeup of the city was 45.8% male and 54.2% female.

2000 census
As of the census of 2000, there were 2,753 people, 1,154 households, and 755 families residing in the city. The population density was 2,338.5 people per square mile (900.8/km2). There were 1,332 housing units at an average density of 1,131.5 per square mile (435.8/km2). The racial makeup of the city was 95.75% White, 0.11% African American, 2.29% Native American, 0.18% Asian, 0.11% Pacific Islander, 0.22% from other races, and 1.34% from two or more races. Hispanic or Latino of any race were 0.94% of the population.

There were 1,154 households, out of which 32.1% had children under the age of 18 living with them, 52.6% were married couples living together, 9.4% had a female householder with no husband present, and 34.5% were non-families. 31.3% of all households were made up of individuals, and 16.2% had someone living alone who was 65 years of age or older. The average household size was 2.33 and the average family size was 2.92.

In the city, the population was spread out, with 26.3% under the age of 18, 5.9% from 18 to 24, 25.7% from 25 to 44, 21.1% from 45 to 64, and 21.0% who were 65 years of age or older. The median age was 40 years. For every 100 females there were 87.9 males. For every 100 females age 18 and over, there were 85.0 males.

The median income for a household in the city was $29,432, and the median income for a family was $42,056. Males had a median income of $31,908 versus $19,286 for females. The per capita income for the city was $15,742. About 10.6% of families and 13.4% of the population were below the poverty line, including 15.3% of those under age 18 and 5.7% of those age 65 or over.

Climate
Conrad experiences a semi-arid climate (Köppen BSk) with cold, dry winters and hot, wetter summers.

Infrastructure

Transportation
Conrad Airport is a public use airport located 1 mile west of town.

Education
Conrad Public Schools educates students from kindergarten through 12th grade. Conrad High School's team name is the Cowboys/Cowgirls.

Conrad Public Library is located in town.

Mayor 
Current: Jamie Miller

Notable people
 LeRoy H. Anderson, Congressman from Montana
 Scott Curry, NFL offensive tackle
 Carol D'Onofrio (1936-2020), public health researcher, born in Conrad, Montana
 Wylie Gustafson, country and western singer
 Llew Jones, member of the Montana Senate
 Kristen Juras, attorney and 37th Lieutenant Governor of Montana
 Duncan McKenzie, former teacher and convicted murderer
 Shannen Rossmiller, youngest female judge in United States history, whose testimony led to the conviction of Ryan G. Anderson, and (Alaskan pipeline terrorist)

References

Cities in Pondera County, Montana
County seats in Montana
Cities in Montana